The Lancashire Fire and Rescue Service is the county-wide, statutory emergency fire and rescue service for the Shire county of Lancashire, England and also includes the unitary authorities of Blackpool and Blackburn with Darwen.

Lancashire Fire & Rescue Service is made up of six Area Commands as follows: Northern, Southern, Eastern, Western, Central and Pennine. Within these areas there are 18 wholetime, 17 retained stations and four day crewed stations providing Lancashire with 24-hour fire cover.

Performance
In 2018/2019, every fire and rescue service in England and Wales was subjected to a statutory inspection by His Majesty's Inspectorate of Constabulary and Fire & Rescue Services (HIMCFRS). The inspection investigated how well the service performs in each of three areas. On a scale of outstanding, good, requires improvement and inadequate, Lancashire Fire and Rescue Service was rated as follows:

See also
Fire service in the United Kingdom
Lancashire Constabulary
GRIP (Group Intervention Panel)
List of British firefighters killed in the line of duty

References

External links

Fire and rescue services of England
Organisations based in Lancashire